The 1984 Giro d'Italia was the 67th edition of the Giro d'Italia, one of cycling's Grand Tours. The Giro began in Lucca, with a prologue individual time trial on 17 May, and Stage 11 occurred on 28 May with a stage to Rieti. The race finished in Verona on 10 June.

Prologue
17 May 1984 — Lucca,  (ITT)

Stage 1
18 May 1984 — Lucca to Marina di Pietrasanta,   (TTT)

Stage 2
19 May 1984 — Marina di Pietrasanta to Firenze,

Stage 3
20 May 1984 — Bologna to Madonna di San Luca,

Stage 4
21 May 1984 — Bologna to Numana,

Stage 5
22 May 1984 — Numana to Blockhaus,

Stage 6
23 May 1984 — Chieti to Foggia,

Stage 7
24 May 1984 — Foggia to Marconia di Pisticci,

Stage 8
25 May 1984 — Policoro to Agropoli,

Stage 9
26 May 1984 — Agropoli to Cava de' Tirreni,

Rest day 1
27 May 1984

Stage 10
28 May 1984 — Cava de' Tirreni to Isernia,

Stage 11
29 May 1984 — Isernia to Rieti,

References

1984 Giro d'Italia
Giro d'Italia stages